Belarmino Correa Yepes (14 July 1930 – 20 March 2020) was a Colombian Roman Catholic bishop.

Correa was born in Colombia and was ordained to the priesthood in 1957. He served as bishop of the Apostolic Vicariate of Mitú, Columbia, from 1967 to 1989, as bishop of the Apostolic Vicariate of the Roman Catholic Diocese of San José del Guaviare, Colombia from 1989 to 1999 and as the first bishop of the San José del Guaviare Diocese from 1999 to 2006.

Notes

1930 births
2020 deaths
20th-century Roman Catholic bishops in Colombia
21st-century Roman Catholic bishops in Colombia
Roman Catholic bishops of Mitú
Roman Catholic bishops of San José del Guaviare